Maathi Yosi is a 2010 Indian Tamil-language drama film written and directed by Nandha Periyasamy and music by Guru Kalyan. Starring Harish, Kanchivaram fame Shammu along with newcomers Gopal, Alex and Lokesh in the lead roles, the film opened to mixed and negative reviews.

Cast 
 Harish as Pandi
 Shammu
 Gopal as Maanga
 Alex as Onaan
 Lokesh as Mari
 Ravi Mariya
 Ponvannan
 G. M. Kumar
 M. Sasikumar as narrator

Plot
The voice of director Sasikumar to introduce the four mischievous guys Pandi, Mangaa, Kona, Maari, in his typical Madurai lingo who think they rule the 'Kadavur' village.

These four friends are united, very close and live for each other. They always think out-of-the box. They turn out to be vagabonds and go to the extent of even killing the village President's son. After few similar delinquent experiences they are forced to leave the village and end up coming to Chennai.

Here's where the main plot begins- how they meet the heroine, and what happens in Chennai with the four friends and the girl forms the rest of the story.

Soundtrack
Soundtrack was composed by Gurukalyan. The soundtrack received positive reviews from critics.
"Methuvai Methuvai" - Karthik, Jaya, Rajgopal
"Kummi Paattu Ponnu" - Karthikeyan, Gurukalyan
"Maathithan Yosi" - Prashanthini, Sathyan
"Acham Thavir" - Kalyan

Reception
Sify wrote "The film does not have a coherent script, logic and lacks focus. It is another 'Made in Madurai' bloodbath that's etched from various earlier movies and a bit from Fernando Meirelles's classic 'City of God'". Times of India wrote "Periyasamy, who had showed some promise in his earlier outing ‘Oru kalooriyin kathai’, is clearly in the grip of the good-at-heart village boys ending up in a mess-street plot. Nothing original, nothing closely resembling out-of- the-box thinking, but a faithful adherence to the way Madurai-belt films pan out."

References

External links
 

2010 films
2010s Tamil-language films
2010s coming-of-age drama films
Indian coming-of-age drama films
2010 drama films